Steve Wilfried Nguema Ndong (11 December 1971 – 25 September 2009) was a Gabonese judoka.

Achievements

External links

Steeve Nguema's obituary 

1971 births
2009 deaths
Gabonese male judoka
Judoka at the 2000 Summer Olympics
Olympic judoka of Gabon
21st-century Gabonese people
African Games medalists in judo
Competitors at the 1995 All-Africa Games
Competitors at the 1999 All-Africa Games
Competitors at the 2003 All-Africa Games
African Games silver medalists for Gabon
African Games bronze medalists for Gabon